Start Treaty may refer to:

START I, a bilateral treaty between the United States of America and the Union of Soviet Socialist Republics (USSR) signed on 31 July 1991
New START, a bilateral treaty between the United States and the Russian Federation signed on 8 April 2010